Yangluozhou Town is an urban town in Yuanjiang, Yiyang, Hunan Province, People's Republic of China.

Administrative division
The town is divided into 18 villages and one community, the following areas: Yongxing Community, Yuejin Village, Shengli Village, Dongxin Village, Baosan Village, Houlong Village, Fuxing Village, Fu'an Village, Fumin Village, Dazhong Village, Youfeng Village, Qizijia Village, Yangluo Village, Fufeng Village, Xingle Village, Tubao Village, Liayi Village, Lvfeng Village, Waganghuyu Village (永兴社区、跃进村、胜利村、东新村、宝三村、候龙村、复兴村、富安村、富民村、大中村、友丰村、七子浃村、阳罗村、富丰村、兴乐村、土垉村、俩仪村、吕丰村、瓦岗湖渔村).

References

Divisions of Yuanjiang